This Is Not a Film is an Iranian documentary film by Jafar Panahi and Mojtaba Mirtahmasb. It was released on 28 September 2011 in France, distributed by Kanibal Films Distribution.

The film was smuggled from Iran to Cannes on a flash drive hidden inside a birthday cake. It was specially screened at the 2011 Cannes Film Festival and later at the New York Film Festival, and others. It also took part in the International Competition of the 27th Warsaw International Film Festival.

Synopsis
Partly shot on an iPhone, this documentary depicts Panahi's day-to-day life while under house arrest in his apartment. He talks to his family and lawyer (he is appealing his sentence) and reflects on the meaning of filmmaking.

Reception
Review aggregation website Rotten Tomatoes gives a score of 97% based on reviews from 97 critics, with an average rating of 8.9/10, and the site's consensus is: "Through simple means and filming, This is Not a Film presents a vital political statement and a snapshot of life in Iran as enemy of the state."  Metacritic rated it 90/100 based on 27 reviews.

Keith Uhlich of Time Out New York named This Is Not A Film the sixth-best film of 2012, calling it an "extraordinarily egoless self-profile" and "protest art at its peak." Sight & Sound placed it eighth on its list of the best films of 2012. Calling This Is Not A Film one of the top 10 movies of 2012, critic Ann Hornaday of The Washington Post said it "uses Brechtian staging, blurred lines between documentary and drama, and an iPhone to explore the notion of physical and political boundaries, the aesthetic and technological contours of cinema, and the enduring power of self-expression." Critic A. O. Scott of The New York Times rated This Is Not a Film the fourth best documentary of 2012, calling it a "brave and witty video diary, an essay on the struggle between political tyranny and the creative imagination." Peter Debruge of Variety called the film "a courageous act of nonviolent protest." Deborah Young of The Hollywood Reporter called it "an unusual documentary" that finds a creative solution to Panahi's ban on filmmaking. Jacques Mandelbaum of Le Monde wrote that the film shows audiences Panahi's courage and dignity. In December 2012 it was shortlisted as one of 15 films eligible for Best Documentary Feature at the 85th Academy Awards.

References

External links
 
 
 

2011 films
2011 documentary films
Films directed by Jafar Panahi
Iranian documentary films
Documentary films about human rights
Censorship in Iran
Film controversies in Iran
Mobile phone films
2010s Persian-language films